George Bunker Glover (traditional Chinese: 吉羅福, simplified Chinese: 吉罗福; 8 Jul 1827 - 4 Oct 1885) was an American who served as a diplomat and also a commissioner in the Imperial Chinese Maritime Customs Service during the late nineteenth century.

Career

References

1827 births
1885 deaths
19th-century American diplomats
American consuls
Consuls general of the United States in Shanghai